Canavalia molokaiensis, commonly known as the Molokai Jack-bean or puakauhi, is a rare species flowering plant in the legume family, Fabaceae, that is endemic to the island of Molokai in Hawaii. This and other Hawaiian Canavalia are known there as ʻāwikiwiki.

The plant is a vine with red-purple pealike flowers. Associated plants include āhinahina (Artemisia spp.), akoko (Euphorbia spp.), pilo (Coprosma spp.), pūkiawe (Styphelia tameiameiae), and ākia (Wikstroemia spp.).

This rare plant is threatened by habitat destruction, mainly due to introduced grazing mammals. It is limited to four populations with a total of 200 to 500 individuals; this is sometimes described as one badly fragmented population. Other threats include introduced plant species. This has been a federally listed endangered species of the United States since 1992.

References

External links

USDA Plants Profile

molokaiensis
Endemic flora of Hawaii
Biota of Molokai
Taxonomy articles created by Polbot